Viktor Durasovic (born 19 March 1997) is a Norwegian professional tennis player.

Durasovic has a career-high Association of Tennis Professionals (ATP) singles ranking of world No. 298, which he achieved in October 2019. He also attained his career-high ATP doubles ranking of world No. 173 in October 2022.

Background 
Durasovic is of Bosnian Serbian origin.

Career 
Durasovic made the semifinals of the 2014 US Open boys' doubles competition where he partnered Nicolae Frunză.

Playing for Norway in Davis Cup, Durasovic has a W/L record of 11–10 in singles and 5–8 in doubles.

In August 2019, Durasovic reached his first ATP Challenger final at the 2019 Tilia Slovenia Open, where he lost 5–7, 3–6 to Slovenian Aljaž Bedene.

Durasovic qualified for his first ATP Tour tournament at the 2021 Stockholm Open where he lost in the first round to wildcard and former world No. 1 Andy Murray in straight sets. He qualified for his second tournament at the 2022 Sydney International where he again met and lost to Andy Murray in the first round.

He represented Norway at the 2020 ATP Cup, the 2022 ATP Cup and the 2023 United Cup.

ATP Challenger and ITF Futures finals

Singles: 15 (7–8)

Doubles: 16 (10–6)

United Cup (0–4)

References

External links
 
 
 

1997 births
Living people
Norwegian male tennis players
Norwegian people of Serbian descent
People from Orkdal
Sportspeople from Oslo
21st-century Norwegian people